The Major Indoor Soccer League, known in its final two seasons as the Major Soccer League, was an indoor soccer league in the United States that played matches from fall 1978 to spring 1992.

National coverage

Hughes Television Network (1979)
For the MISL's first season, a mini‐playoff package of the indoor championships was broadcast on the Hughes Television Network, which was an ad hoc syndicated network. In the New York area, WOR 9 broadcast two weekend games. The finals — a two‐of‐three‐game series which was scheduled to begin either on a Thursday or Friday — would be seen in New York the following week.

USA Network (1981–1983)
Beginning in the 1981–82 season, the USA Network broadcast a Friday night Game of the Week. USA employed Al Trautwig and Kyle Rote Jr. as their primary broadcasting crew.

Despite the great exposure during its two-year deal with USA, MISL officials were continuously inquiring about how much they were paying them. USA told the MISL's television committee that they weren't getting any big ratings and couldn't pay them. To put things into perspective, the USA Network during its infancy, only had about 1.3 million subscribers. And an even smaller percentage of those subscribers watched sports programming, much less indoor soccer.

CBS (1983–1985)

On May 7, 1983, the MISL made its network television debut on CBS, who carried the playoff game between the Baltimore Blast and Cleveland Force  in Cleveland. CBS used this particular game as counter-programming against the Kentucky Derby on ABC. Ultimately however, CBS only got a 2.4 rating and 6 share. John Tesh and Al Trautwig called this very first broadcast for CBS.

The following year on June 2, CBS broadcast Baltimore-St. Louis Steamers championship series game from St. Louis. This time, the ratings sunk to a 1.5 rating and 6 share.

On May 25, 1985, CBS showed Game 4 of the championship series between the San Diego Sockers and the Baltimore Blast. This would be the final year that the MISL would have its games aired on network television. For this final game, CBS used Gary Bender and Kyle Rote Jr. on commentary.

ESPN (1985–1987)

The MISL landed a steady national TV contract for the first time since 1983 when they were on USA, as ESPN would televise 15 regular-season games on Sunday afternoons, the All-Star Game and assorted playoff games. beginning in the 1985–86 season. The MISL received no broadcast revenues from ESPN. In other words, the agreement with ESPN to had the league pay the cable network to televise its games. Bill Kentling, director and general manager of the Wichita Wings, was vehemently against the ESPN deal, thinking that was ridiculous to go against the National Football League without having any time to set up sponsorship. Commissioner Frank Dale however, disagreed with Kentling's assessment saying: “If I held out waiting for money for the rights for something that has traditionally not done well in the ratings, we’d still be off the air.” Ultimately, the MISL got only three sponsors for the weekly telecasts on ESPN.

For the 1986–87 season, ESPN actually paid the MISL a fee instead of the league paying the network, as it had done the previous season. This time, ESPN broadcast 18 games, including the All-Star Game from Los Angeles, as well as four playoff games. The San Diego Sockers were scheduled to be on four delayed telecasts during the regular season.

On commentary, ESPN employed JP Dellacamera, Bob Kurtz, Bob Ley, and Bob Carpenter on play-by-play with Ty Keough, Seamus Malin, and Shep Messing as analysts.

FNN/Score (1987–1989)
The MISL marked the 1987–88 season by signing a two-year TV agreement with FNN/Score. This package included a Friday game of the week, as well as the All-Star Game, the entire championship series and a weekly highlight show. In San Diego (home of the Sockers), the games were not seen locally because FNN went off the air in San Diego before the games began. JP Dellacamera and Ty Keough were the primary broadcast team for FNN/Score.

ESPN (1989–1990)
The MISL returned to ESPN in time for the 1989–90 season, when they reached agreement with ESPN for a nine game TV schedule. ESPN also televised MISL playoff games on May 2, 17, 24, 27 and June 9. The last game was expected to be broadcast live, with the others tape-delayed, but shown the same day.

SportsChannel America (1990–1992)
As previously mentioned, the Major Indoor Soccer League was known in its final two seasons as the Major Soccer League. At this time, commissioner Earl Foreman hoped to escalate the MSL's nine-game tape-delay ESPN contract into a live contract come the 1990–91 season. But a deal never came off, and Foreman had to settle for a 15-game live contract with SportsChannel America. The first year of what would be a two-year deal included 10 regular-season Sunday afternoon games billed and marketed as a "game of the week," the All-Star Game from Kansas City's Kemper Arena and four playoff games. The only game that was not broadcast live was a March 10, 1991 game between the Baltimore Blast and San Diego Sockers in San Diego. The game was played Saturday night and then shown on tape delay the next day at 4:05 p.m., Baltimore time.

SportsChannel's coverage began February 3, 1991 with the Wichita Wings playing at the Kansas City Comets. The rest of the regular-season schedule included: February 10 -- Cleveland at Tacoma; February 17 -- Wichita at Dallas; February 24 -- Kansas City at Cleveland; March 3 -- Tacoma at St. Louis; March 10 -- Baltimore at San Diego; March 17 -- Cleveland at Dallas; March 24 -- Wichita at Cleveland; March 31 -- St. Louis at San Diego; April 7 -- St. Louis at Wichita. John Griffin, MSL director of communications who put the TV schedule together, said Baltimore's inability to start its Sunday home games at 4:05 p.m. prevented the Blast from being televised more often on SportsChannel.

In the middle of what would be MSL's final season, 1991–92, commissioner Earl Foreman held preliminary talks with SportsChannel concerning added MSL coverage should the National Hockey League's strike continue. At the time, SportsChannel also held the American broadcasting rights to the NHL. Ultimately however, the NHL strike only lasted for ten days. Come playoff time, SportsChannel televised six playoff games. Earl Foreman said that owners decided to use all six telecasts on the championship series.

JP Dellacamera and Ty Keough served as the primary broadcast crew for SportsChannel.

See also
List of Major Indoor Soccer League (1978–1992) broadcasters

References

External links
MISL: A Look Back - MISL (Major Indoor Soccer League)

 
CBS Sports
CBS original programming
CBS Sports Spectacular
USA Network original programming
USA Network Sports
ESPN original programming
SportsChannel
Hughes Television Network
Soccer on United States television
History of sports broadcasting